PS Topaz is a  owned and operated by the Seychelles Coast Guard. She was formerly operated by the Indian Navy as INS Tarmugli (T64). India, like China and the United Arab Emirates, have helped equip the Seychelles Coast Guard with patrol vessels.  India, China, and the UAE helped equip the tiny Seychelles with these patrol vessels due to its strategic location, very near the area off the Horn of Africa that is notorious for pirate attacks.

In 2005, she was the first vessel India turned over to Seychelles.  A sister ship, re-christened , was transferred in 2014.

References

External links

 

Trinkat-class patrol vessels
Seychelles Coast Guard